Dongargarh is a Major town of india and municipality in Rajnandgaon District  in the state of Chhattisgarh, India and the site of the Bambleshwari Temple and  Chandragiri Jain Temple. Featuring majestic mountains and ponds, Dongargarh is derived from the words: Dongarh meaning 'mountains' and garh meaning 'fort'. It is also a best tourism place in Chhattisgarh

It is of great spiritual importance and several legends are associated with this shrine too. Another prominent shrine in the vicinity is Chhoti Bamleshwari Temple. Devotees flock these temples during Navratri. Shivji Temple and temples dedicated to Lord Hanuman are also located here. The ropeway is an added attraction and is the only passenger ropeway in Chhattisgarh. A severe accident occurred in 2016 when the ropeway broke and fell down killing several people.

The town is known for religious Harmony and has considerable population of Buddhists, Sikhs, Christians and Jains apart from Hindus.A 30 feet high statue of Budhha situated at the hilltop of the Pragyagiri hill is another attraction of the town. This is visible from the all the 06 major hills of the town. In addition to these, A Jain temple is also being constructed  on a hill known as Chandragiri with the blessings of Jain saint Acharya Shri Vidyasagar Ji Maharaaj. The temple is specially recognized for an ancient statue of the Teerthankara god Chandraprabhuji. One of the biggest gurudwaras in the state is also located in the heart of the city managed by the Sikh society which also run Khalsa Public School, one of the biggest schools in the town. Dongargarhs oldest and most beautiful Roman Catholic church ( Secred Heart Church ) is situated just near the railway station as well as there is a tall and beautiful Calvary hill near the railway colony which has a huge cross on the tip of the hill which can be seen from a far distance during the day. Every year a huge crowd of devotees Christians and other Religions gather here during the month of April for the way of the cross marking the Crucifixion of Jesus Christ as well as to get his blessings.

Dongargarh has good road communication and buses and taxis are available from Rajnandgaon.

Demographics
 India census, Dongargarh had a population of 37,372 with males constituting 52% of the population and females 48%. The city's average literacy rate is 80%, which is higher than the national average of 59.5%; male literacy is 81% and, female literacy is 66%. In Dongragarh, 12% of the population is under 6 years of age.

Transport
Dongargarh Is A Station On The Howrah-Nagpur-Mumbai line. It Falls Under Secr Nagpur Division.

Education
Jawahar Navodaya Vidyalaya (Only Navodaya school in Rajnandgaon District),
Kendriya Vidyalaya (Central School (India))
St. Vincent Palloti International Residential School 
Wesleyan English Med. Hr. Secondary School
Khalsa Public School
Govt.Boys & Girls Hr.School
Saraswati shishu mandir, Hr. School
St. Peter's convent, High. School

Gallery

References

Cities and towns in Rajnandgaon district
Rajnandgaon